Pallas's rosefinch (Carpodacus roseus) is a species of bird in the finch family Fringillidae. It is found in China, Japan, Kazakhstan, Korea, Mongolia, and Russia. Birds are occasionally reported from further west and there are records from several European regions, including Britain, but the cage-bird trade makes the origin of some such birds hard to assess. Its natural habitats are boreal forests and boreal shrubland.

Description
Pallas's rosefinch is around 16–17.5 cm in length. It is a medium-sized to large slender rosefinch with a long notched tail.

References

Pallas's rosefinch
Pallas's rosefinch
Birds of North Asia
Birds of Mongolia
Pallas's rosefinch
Taxonomy articles created by Polbot